Govindpur may refer to:

Places in India

 Govindpur Jhakhraha, a village in Vaishali district, Bihar 
 Govindpur, Bihar, a village in Nawada district, Bihar
 Govindpur (community development block), in Dhanbad district, Jharkhand
 Govindpur, Jharkhand, a census town in Dhanbad district, Jharkhand
 Govindpur Area, an operational area of BCCL in Dhanbad district, Jharkhand
 Govindpur Road, a town in Khunti district, Jharkhand
 Govindpur, a village panchayat in Cuttack district, Odisha; see Salepur (Odisha Vidhan Sabha constituency)
 Govindpur, Allahabad, a neighbourhood in Allahabad city, Uttar Pradesh
 Govindpur, Ballia, a village of Ballia district, Uttar Pradesh

Other places
 Govindpur Taregana, a village development committee in Siraha District, Sagarmatha Zone, Nepal

See also
 Gobindpur (disambiguation)
 Gobindapur (disambiguation)
 Govindapur (disambiguation)
 Govindapura (disambiguation)